Slán leis an gCeol is a 2019 film documenting the life of Tony MacMahon, an Irish traditional musician. The film was directed and produced by Irish filmmaker Cathal Ó Cuaig.

The film premiered at the Temple Bar TradFest on the 26 January 2019 and was attended by the President of Ireland Michael D. Higgins as guest of honour. This screening was followed by a Q&A with Tony MacMahon and Cathal Ó Cuaig, hosted by Tristan Rosenstock. It also was shown at the 2019 Dingle International Film Festival on 24 March 2019. It was first broadcast on RTÉ One television on the 28 March 2019.

It won the Celtic Media Festival's Torc Award for Excellence in the Arts category in 2020. It has also won the European Prix CIRCOM Regional Programme Award in 2020 in the Music & Arts category. 

The film was broadcast on Croatian Television Broadcaster HRT on 14 May 2021. On 15 June 2021, the Galician Television Channel CRTVG also broadcast the film.

References

External links

Prix Circom Competition Trailer
Barra Ó Séaghdhna's Review (Journal of Music)
2020 Prix Circom Jury Verdict
Katy Hayes Review (The Times) Paywall
Emmanuel Kehoe Review (Business Post) Paywall
Marcus Ó Conaire Review (Tuairisc)
RTE Arena Sean Rocks talks to Cathal Ó Cuaig about 'Slán leis an gCeol'
Director Cathal Ó Cuaig's interview with RTÉ Culture

2019 films
2019 documentary films
Irish documentary films